The government of Shapour Bakhtiar is the last government during the Pahlavi dynasty that ended with the Islamic Revolution. The head of this 37-day government, Shapour Bakhtiar, was one of the leaders of the National Front of Iran. The National Front of Iran had announced in a statement on December 29, 1978 that if Bakhtiar accepted the post of Prime Minister of Iran, he would be expelled from the National Front. The day after the Prime Minister was received, his dismissal was voted on at a meeting of the Central Council, and his dismissal was decided by an overwhelming majority.

Background of government formation 
The Shah of Iran, Mohammad Reza Pahlavi, whose government was in decline, was looking for someone to agree to leave Iran on acceptable and confidential terms. To this end, he first met with Ahmad Bani Ahmad and Karim Sanjabi and asked them to accept the Prime Minister of the government. Citing a three-point declaration and opposing the army remaining in the royal family and the Shah refusing to step down as commander-in-chief of the Armed Forces, Sanjabi refused to accept a compromise with the Shah.

Mohammad Reza Pahlavi then met with Muzaffar Baghaei and Gholam Hossein Sedighi, other leaders of the National Front, and offered to take over the government, but each of them refused to accept the government for some reason. The Shah's offer to the Prime Minister to Siddiqui and Baqaei failed because they both made the acceptance of the Shah's offer conditional on Mohammad Reza Pahlavi remaining in Iran but not in Tehran. The two argued that the Shah's personal presence in Iran, because of his close ties to the army, maintained the unity and cohesion of the army.

Bakhtiar, a member of the Central Council of the National Front, presented the seven conditions (the Shah should leave the country and pledge to reign from now on and not the government, the choice of ministers is unique, SAVAK to be dissolved (deportation of 14 soldiers) Stubbornly, including Gholam-Ali Oveissi), political prisoners should be released, conditions for press freedom should be provided, the Pahlavi Foundation should be transferred to the government, and the imperial commission interfering in all matters should be removed) and agreed to head a civilian government. The Shah accepted all of his terms and appointed him Prime Minister.

Bakhtiar introduced his government and its plan to the parliament on December 11, 1978. On December 17, 1978, Bakhtiar and his ministers received a vote of confidence from the parliament with 149 votes in favor, 43 against and 13 abstentions. Mohammad Reza Pahlavi and his wife Farah Pahlavi left the country on 17 January 1979.

Cabinet 
Members of Bakhtiar's cabinet were as follows:

See also 

 Iranian Revolution

References

External links 

 

1979 establishments in Iran
1979 disestablishments in Iran
Cabinets disestablished in 1979
Cabinets of Iran
Cabinets established in 1979